This is a list of Albanian football transfers for the 2008-09 season by club. Only transfers of the Albanian Superliga are included.

Player Transfers

Dinamo Tirana

In:

Out:

Apolonia Fier

In:

Out:

Besa Kavajë

In:

Out:

Bylis Ballsh

In:

Out:

KF Elbasani

In:

Out:

Flamurtari

In:

Out:

Albania
2008 Summer
Trans